Rachel Perkins (born 1970) is an Australian film and television director, producer, and screenwriter. She directed the films Radiance (1998), One Night the Moon (2001), Bran Nue Dae (2010), and Jasper Jones (2017). Perkins is an Arrernte and Kalkadoon woman from Central Australia, who was raised in Canberra by Aboriginal activist Charles Perkins and his wife Eileen.

Early life and education
Perkins was born in Canberra, Australian Capital Territory in 1970. She is the daughter of Charlie Perkins, granddaughter of Hetty Perkins, and has Arrernte, Kalkadoon, Irish, and German ancestry. Her siblings are Adam and Hetti Perkins, an art curator, and her niece is actress Madeleine Madden. For schooling she and her sister attended Melrose High School.

At the age of 18 Perkins moved to Alice Springs and entered into a traineeship at the Central Australian Aboriginal Media Association.

Career
In 1992, Perkins founded Blackfella Films, a documentary and narrative production company creating distinctive Australian content for television, live theatre, and online platforms, with a particular focus on Indigenous Australian stories. Its productions have included multi-award winning seven-part documentary series First Australians, television film Mabo, and TV series Redfern Now.

She served as Commissioner with the Australian Film Commission from 2004 to 2008, and since 2009 has been on the board of Screen Australia.

She was also curator for the 2009 Message Sticks Indigenous Film Festival. This tenth anniversary of the festival held at the Sydney Opera House featured the premiere of Fire Talker, a documentary film about her father Charlie Perkins by Australian filmmaker Ivan Sen.

Since 2015, Perkins has been the president of the AIATSIS Foundation, which is part of the Australian Institute of Aboriginal and Torres Strait Islander Studies.

She has continued to make award-winning films and TV series (see below).

In 2019, she was invited to give the ABC's annual Boyer Lecture, which she titled The End of Silence, and broadcast on ABC RN in November and available as a podcast.

Personal life
Perkins has a son with her ex-husband filmmaker Richard McGrath.

Selected filmography
Blood Brothers (film series) (1993) – producer, director, writerRadiance (1998) – directorOne Night the Moon (2001) – director, writerFlat (2002) – producerMimi (2002) – producerFirst Australians (2008) – producer, director, writer, narratorBran Nue Dae (2010) – director, writerMabo (2012) – directorBlack Panther Woman (2014) – directorFirst Contact (2014) – producerJasper Jones (2017) – directorThe Prospector (TBD) – director
 Mystery Road (2019 & 2020) TV series
 Total Control (2019) TV series
  The Australian Wars  (2022), a three-part documentary series about the Australian frontier wars on SBS Television – director, producer and presenter

Awards

Australian Film Institute
1998 – AFI Award Best Achievement in Direction: Radiance (1998) (nominated)
2002 – Byron Kennedy Award
Australian Writers' Guild
2001 – Awgie Award Television – Television Original: One Night the Moon (2001)
2001 – Major Award: One Night the Moon (2001)
Canberra International Film Festival
1998 – Audience Award: Radiance (1998)
Film Critics Circle of Australia Awards
2002 – Special Achievement Award: One Night the Moon (2001)
IF Awards
2001 – IF Award Best Direction: One Night the Moon (2001) (nominated)
Melbourne International Film Festival
1998 – Most Popular Feature Film: Radiance (1998)
New York International Independent Film & Video Festival
2001 – Genre Award Best Feature Film – Musical: One Night the Moon (2001)
AACTA Awards
2019 - Best Television Drama
Australian Directors' Guild Awards
2019 - Best director in a television drama series, for Mystery Road, Series 1
Tudawali Film and Video Awards
1994 – The Tudawali Award: Blood Brothers (1993)
2000 – Best direction: Radiance'' (1998)

References

Further reading

 (bio)

Unearthing our first voices (Canberra Times) 
 Article about Rachel Perkins and her movie Radiance in Urban Cinefile

External links

 

1970 births
Living people
Australian film producers
Australian film directors
Australian women film directors
Australian television producers
Australian women television producers
Australian television directors
Indigenous Australian musicians
Australian screenwriters
Indigenous Australian filmmakers
Arrernte people
Australian people of Irish descent
Australian people of German descent
Australian women television directors